Ratkovská Suchá is a village and municipality in the Rimavská Sobota District of the Banská Bystrica Region of southern Slovakia.

References

External links
 
 

Villages and municipalities in Rimavská Sobota District